The Man from Utah is a 1934 pre-Code Monogram Western film starring John Wayne, Polly Ann Young and the stuntman/actor Yakima Canutt. It was written by Lindsley Parsons and directed by Robert N. Bradbury. Wayne has a "singing cowboy scene" in the film, wherein his voice is dubbed.

Plot
An impoverished saddle tramp from Utah, John Weston, rides into a small town seeking work. He finds himself gunning down a trio of men robbing a local bank. The marshal sees the fearless, quick-drawing, sharp-shooting, hard-riding stranger as the man for the marshal's plan of discovering who is behind a crooked rodeo. A further mystery is that several rodeo riders have died of snakebite. Weston enters the rodeo as part of a plan to uncover the crooks. He manages to win every event he enters while also solving the crime, including the snakebite mystery, and winning the affection of the local judge's daughter.

Cast
 John Wayne as John Weston
 Polly Ann Young as Marjorie Carter
 Anita Campillo as Dolores
 Edward Peil Sr. as Spike Barton
 George "Gabby" Hayes as Marshal George Higgins
 Yakima Canutt as Cheyenne Kent
 George Cleveland as Nevada sheriff

See also
 John Wayne filmography
 List of American films of 1934

References

External links
 
 
 
 
 
 

1934 films
American black-and-white films
1930s English-language films
Films directed by Robert N. Bradbury
1934 Western (genre) films
Monogram Pictures films
American Western (genre) films
1930s American films